The  Green Bay Packers season was their 67th season overall and their 65th in the National Football League. The team finished with an 8–8 record under second-year head coach Forrest Gregg, the same record as the previous two seasons.

The Packers were again second in the NFC Central division, but seven games behind the Chicago Bears, the eventual Super Bowl champions.

Offseason

NFL draft

Personnel

Staff

Roster

Regular season
The Packers finished with an 8–8 record for a third consecutive season; 5–3 at home and 3–5 on the road.

Schedule

Note: Intra-division opponents are in bold text.

Game summaries

Week 10

Week 13

    
    
    

This divisional matchup with Tampa Bay would come to be known as the Snow Bowl in Packers' history.  By kickoff, twelves inches of snow had fallen and the roads were impossible to navigate preventing many fans from attending.  This gave the game the dubious distinction of having over 36,000 "no-shows", the most in Packers history.

The game itself saw the Packers dominate the Buccaneers en route to a 21–0 victory.  The Packers offense gained 512 total yards to the Buccaneers' 65.  During the game, Packers defensive end Alphonso Carreker sacked Buccaneers quarterback Steve Young a team record four times.

Standings

Statistics

Passing

Receiving

Rushing

Defensive

Awards and records

Hall of Famers
The Following were inducted into the Green Bay Packers Hall of Fame in February 1985;

 Phil Bengtson, Coach-G.M., 1959–70
 Bob Jeter, CB, 1963–70
 Earl "Bud" Svendsen, C-LB, 1937, 1939

References

 Sportsencyclopedia.com
 Football database

Green Bay Packers seasons
Green Bay Packers
Green Bay